Tahabad-e Jameh Shuran (also Romanized as Tāhābād-e Jāmeh Shūrān; also known as Parpisha, Par Pīsheh, Tāzehābād, and Tāzehābād-e Jāmeh Shūrān) is a village in Panjeh Ali Rural District, in the Central District of Qorveh County, Kurdistan Province, Iran. At the 2006 census, its population was 478, in 107 families. The village is populated by Kurds.

References 

Towns and villages in Qorveh County
Kurdish settlements in Kurdistan Province